Zeynabad (also Romanized as Zeynābād and Zin Abad) is a village in Qasemabad Rural District, in the Central District of Rafsanjan County, Kerman Province, Iran. At the 2006 census, its population was 272, in 68 families.

References 

Populated places in Rafsanjan County